Beauce-Sud is a provincial electoral district in the Chaudière-Appalaches and Estrie regions of Quebec, Canada that elects members to the National Assembly of Quebec.  It notably includes the municipalities of Saint-Georges, Saint-Prosper, Saint-Côme-Linière, Saint-Martin, Saint-Éphrem-de-Beauce and Saint-Gédéon-de-Beauce.

It was created along with Beauce-Nord for the 1973 election from parts of Beauce electoral district, at the same time also gaining a piece of the old Frontenac district.

There were boundary changes elsewhere between the 2001 and 2011 electoral maps, but the territory of Beauce-Sud was unchanged.

Members of the National Assembly

Election results

* Result compared to Action démocratique

* Result compared to UFP

References

External links
Information
 Elections Quebec

Election results
 Election results (National Assembly)
 Election results (QuébecPolitique)

Maps
 2011 map (PDF)
 2001 map (Flash)
2001–2011 changes (Flash)
1992–2001 changes (Flash)
 Electoral map of Chaudière-Appalaches region
 Electoral map of Estrie region
 Quebec electoral map, 2011

Quebec provincial electoral districts
Saint-Georges, Quebec